Nectandra cordata is a species of plant in the family Lauraceae. It is endemic to Peru.

References

cordata
Endemic flora of Peru
Data deficient plants
Taxonomy articles created by Polbot
Trees of Peru